Kent Station may refer to:
 Kent station (OC Transpo), a bus stop in Ottawa, Ontario, Canada
 Cork Kent railway station, a station of the Iarnród Éireann (Irish Rail) in Cork, Ireland
 Kent station (Sound Transit), a station of Sounder commuter rail in Kent, Washington, U.S.
 Kent station (Connecticut), former train station on the Housatonic Railroad
 Kent station (Erie Railroad), former Erie station in Kent, Ohio, U.S.